The 2022 Indiana Fever season is the franchise's 23rd season in the Women's National Basketball Association.  The regular season tips off on May 6, 2022, at the Washington Mystics.

The Fever landed the 2nd overall pick in the 2022 WNBA Draft - despite having the best odds in the lottery drawing. On February 14, 2022, Tamika Catchings and the Fever parted ways as Vice President of Basketball Operations and General Manager. On February 24, 2022, the Fever announced that former head coach Lin Dunn would serve as interim General Manager for the year.

On May 25, after the team started 2–7, it was announced that the team had dismissed head coach Marianne Stanley.  Stanley left after two complete seasons, with an overall record of 14–49.  Carlos Knox was announced as the interim coach for the remainder of the season.  The team would finish May 3–8.  Fortunes would remain similar under Knox, as the team would lose five games in a row after winning the first game Knox coached.  They finished June 2–8, with a bright spot being a win over Chicago.  The win over Chicago would prove to be their final win of the season.  The Fever lost all eleven games they played in July and all four games they played in August to finish the season on an eighteen game losing streak.  Their .139 winning percentage was the worst in franchise history.  Their five wins, were also the lowest in franchise history.

Transactions

WNBA Draft

Trades and Roster Changes

Roster

Depth

Schedule

Preseason

|- style="background:#cfc;"
| 1
| April 30
| Chicago
| W 79–75
| Queen Egbo (15)
| Queen Egbo (10)
| Kelsey Mitchell (5)
| Gainbridge FieldhouseN/A
| 1–0

|- style="background:#fcc;"
| 2
| May 2
| @ Dallas
| L 89–101
| Kelsey Mitchell (22)
| Queen Egbo (9)
| Destanni Henderson (6)
| College Park CenterN/A
| 1–1

Regular season

|- style="background:#fcc;"
| 1
| May 6
| @ Washington
| L 70–84
| Kelsey Mitchell (18)
| NaLyssa Smith (13)
| Destanni Henderson (5)
| Entertainment and Sports Arena4,200
| 0–1
|- style="background:#fcc;"
| 2
| May 8
| Los Angeles
| L 77–87
| Destanni Henderson (19)
| NaLyssa Smith (9)
| Kelsey Mitchell (7)
| Gainbridge Fieldhouse1,456
| 0–2
|- style="background:#cfc;"
| 3
| May 10
| Minnesota
| W 82–76
| Kelsey Mitchell (26)
| Queen Egbo (8)
| Crystal Dangerfield (6)
| Gainbridge Fieldhouse1,078
| 1–2
|- style="background:#cfc;"
| 4
| May 13
| @ New York
| W 92–86 (OT)
| Kelsey Mitchell (24)
| NaLyssa Smith (17)
| Queen Egbo (4)
| Barclays Center3,289
| 2–2
|- style="background:#fcc;"
| 5
| May 15
| Atlanta
| L 79–85
| Kelsey Mitchell (27)
| Queen Egbo (9)
| K. MitchellRobinson (4)
| Gainbridge Fieldhouse1,745
| 2–3
|- style="background:#fcc;"
| 6
| May 17
| Atlanta
| L 79–101
| Victoria Vivians (16)
| Emily Engstler (10)
| Kelsey Mitchell (5)
| Gainbridge Fieldhouse960
| 2–4
|- style="background:#fcc;"
| 7
| May 20
| @ Connecticut
| L 85–94
| Kelsey Mitchell (23)
| Queen Egbo (7)
| Danielle Robinson (6)
| Mohegan Sun Arena4,428
| 2–5
|- style="background:#fcc;"
| 8
| May 22
| Connecticut
| L 70–92
| Victoria Vivians (15)
| Queen Egbo (8)
| Kelsey Mitchell (5)
| Gainbridge Fieldhouse2,612
| 2–6
|- style="background:#fcc;"
| 9
| May 24
| @ Chicago
| L 90–95
| Kelsey Mitchell (25)
| Emily Engstler (13)
| EngstlerT. Mitchell (4)
| Wintrust Arena7,741
| 2–7
|- style="background:#cfc;"
| 10
| May 27
| Los Angeles
| W 101–96
| Kelsey Mitchell (22)
| Emily Engstler (9)
| Danielle Robinson (11)
| Indiana Farmers Coliseum1,417
| 3–7
|- style="background:#fcc;"
| 11
| May 31
| Washington
| L 75–87
| Kelsey Mitchell (26)
| Queen Egbo (10)
| K. MitchellVivians (4)
| Indiana Farmers Coliseum1,009
| 3–8
|-

|- style="background:#fcc;"
| 12
| June 1
| @ New York
| L 74–87
| Kelsey Mitchell (17)
| EgboRobinsonN. Smith (6)
| K. MitchellN. SmithVivians (4)
| Barclays Center4,079
| 3–9
|- style="background:#fcc;"
| 13
| June 5
| @ Atlanta
| L 66–75
| Kelsey Mitchell (20)
| Queen Egbo (8)
| Destanni Henderson (5)
| Gateway Center Arena3,000
| 3–10
|- style="background:#fcc;"
| 14
| June 8
| @ Connecticut
| L 69–88
| NaLyssa Smith (19)
| NaLyssa Smith (7)
| Kelsey Mitchell (5)
| Mohegan Sun Arena4,088
| 3–11
|- style="background:#fcc;"
| 15
| June 10
| New York
| L 83–97
| Kelsey Mitchell (23)
| NaLyssa Smith (9)
| K. MitchellVivians (4)
| Indiana Farmers Coliseum1,393
| 3–12
|- style="background:#cfc;"
| 16
| June 12
| @ Minnesota
| W 84–80
| NaLyssa Smith (21)
| NaLyssa Smith (14)
| Danielle Robinson (6)
| Target Center6,806
| 4–12
|- style="background:#fcc;"
| 17
| June 15
| Phoenix
| L 93–80
| Kelsey Mitchell (26)
| NaLyssa Smith (14)
| Danielle Robinson (6)
| Indiana Farmers Coliseum1,824
| 4–13
|- style="background:#cfc;"
| 18
| June 19
| Chicago
| W 89–87
| NaLyssa Smith (26)
| NaLyssa Smith (11)
| Kelsey Mitchell (9)
| Indiana Farmers Coliseum1,706
| 5–13
|- style="background:#fcc;"
| 19
| June 23
| @ Dallas
| L 68–94
| Kelsey Mitchell (22)
| Queen Egbo (12)
| Danielle Robinson (5)
| College Park Center2,791
| 5–14
|- style="background:#fcc;"
| 20
| June 27
| @ Phoenix
| L 71–83
| Kelsey Mitchell (22)
| NaLyssa Smith (10)
| K. MitchellRobinson (4)
| Footprint Center5,044
| 5–15
|- style="background:#fcc;"
| 21
| June 29
| @ Phoenix
| L 78–99
| Kelsey Mitchell (21)
| Emily Engstler (8)
| Kelsey Mitchell (5)
| Footprint Center5,833
| 5–16

|- style="background:#fcc;"
| 22
| July 1
| @ Seattle
| L 57–73
| Queen Egbo (14)
| Queen Egbo (12)
| Tiffany Mitchell (3)
| Climate Pledge Arena8,565
| 5–17
|- style="background:#fcc;"
| 23
| July 5
| Seattle
| L 73–95
| Kelsey Mitchell (21)
| RobinsonVivians (6)
| Danielle Robinson (4)
| Indiana Farmers Coliseum2,585
| 5–18
|- style="background:#fcc;"
| 24
| July 7
| Chicago
| L 84–93
| Kelsey Mitchell (27)
| NaLyssa Smith (11)
| K. MitchellRobinson (5)
| Indiana Farmers Coliseum1,839
| 5–19
|- style="background:#fcc;"
| 25
| July 13
| Connecticut
| L 81–89
| Kelsey Mitchell (21)
| NaLyssa Smith (13)
| EngstlerVivians (4)
| Indiana Farmers Coliseum3,212
| 5–20
|- style="background:#fcc;"
| 26
| July 15
| Minnesota
| L 77–87
| Tiffany Mitchell (18)
| NaLyssa Smith (9)
| EngstlerK. Mitchell (4)
| Indiana Farmers Coliseum1,530
| 5–21
|- style="background:#fcc;"
| 27
| July 17
| @ Seattle
| L 65–81
| NaLyssa Smith (15)
| NaLyssa Smith (9)
| K. MitchellRobinson (4)
| Climate Pledge Arena9,970
| 5–22
|- style="background:#fcc;"
| 28
| July 19
| @ Los Angeles
| L 79–86
| Tiffany Mitchell (22)
| Queen Egbo (9)
| K. MitchellRobinson (5)
| Crypto.com Arena5,478
| 5–23
|- style="background:#fcc;"
| 29
| July 21
| @ Las Vegas
| L 77–90
| NaLyssa Smith (24)
| Queen Egbo (8)
| Kelsey Mitchell (7)
| Michelob Ultra Arena5,737
| 5–24
|- style="background:#fcc;"
| 30
| July 24
| Dallas
| L 86–96
| Kelsey Mitchell (34)
| Victoria Vivians (6)
| Kelsey Mitchell (6)
| Hinkle Fieldhouse1,048
| 5–25
|- style="background:#fcc;"
| 31
| July 29
| Las Vegas
| L 72–93
| Queen Egbo (13)
| NaLyssa Smith (10)
| EngstlerHendersonK. MitchellRobinson (4)
| Hinkle Fieldhouse1,828
| 5–26
|- style="background:#fcc;"
| 32
| July 31
| Las Vegas
| L 69–94
| NaLyssa Smith (18)
| NaLyssa Smith (13)
| Destanni Henderson (4)
| Hinkle Fieldhouse1,822
| 5–27
|-

|- style="background:#fcc;"
| 33
| August 3
| @ Atlanta
| L 81–91
| NaLyssa Smith (21)
| Emma Cannon (8)
| Victoria Vivians (6)
| Gateway Center Arena2,071
| 5–28
|- style="background:#fcc;"
| 34
| August 6
| @ Dallas
| L 91–95 (OT)
| Lexie Hull (17)
| Emma Cannon (8)
| Danielle Robinson (8)
| College Park Center4,184
| 5–29
|- style="background:#fcc;"
| 35
| August 12
| Washington
| L 70–82
| Emily Engstler (18)
| Emma Cannon (8)
| Destanni Henderson (6)
| Hinkle Fieldhouse1,700
| 5–30
|- style="background:#fcc;"
| 36
| August 14
| @ Washington
| L 83–95
| Tiffany Mitchell (18)
| EgboEngstlerN. Smith (4)
| Tiffany Mitchell (7)
| Entertainment and Sports Arena4,200
| 5–31
|-

Standings

Statistics

Regular Season

‡Waived/Released during the season
†Traded during the season
≠Acquired during the season

Awards and Honors

References

External links 
 Official website of the Indiana Fever

2022 WNBA season
2022
2022 in sports in Indiana